Mamadou Diaw Diallo (born 1969) is a Guinean wrestler. He competed in the men's freestyle 74 kg at the 1988 Summer Olympics.

References

1969 births
Living people
Guinean male sport wrestlers
Olympic wrestlers of Guinea
Wrestlers at the 1988 Summer Olympics
Place of birth missing (living people)